Pink Friday: Roman Reloaded – The Re-Up is the reissue of rapper Nicki Minajs second studio album Pink Friday: Roman Reloaded (2012). It was released on November 19, 2012, by Young Money, Cash Money, and Republic Records. Released seven months after the original, The Re-Up features seven newly recorded songs and an exclusive behind-the-scenes footage DVD. The new material incorporates hip hop and R&B styles. As co-executive producer, Minaj enlisted collaborators Boi-1da, Juicy J and T-Minus.

Upon its release, Pink Friday: Roman Reloaded – The Re-Up received generally positive reviews from music critics, who complimented the balanced variety of genres. Its three singles "The Boys", "Freedom", and "High School" peaked at numbers 41, 31, and 20 on the US Billboard Hot R&B/Hip-Hop Songs chart respectively, and the latter peaked at number 64 on the Billboard Hot 100. The album was additionally promoted through the Pink Friday: Reloaded Tour and Minaj's performance of "Freedom" at the 2012 American Music Awards.

Background
At the 2012 MTV Video Music Awards, Minaj announced the reissue of Pink Friday: Roman Reloaded, subtitled The Re-Up, commenting "I'm putting lots of new songs on there and I'm actually going to drop my new single like next week. Barbz, you are gonna spaz. You are gonna love it. You are gonna go crazy!" Its artwork was released the following month, featuring an image of Minaj from the music video of her song "I Am Your Leader". In November, she added that the expanded album would contain an additional disc with seven newly recorded songs and an exclusive behind-the-scenes DVD to supplement the standard edition of the original album. The project served as the main focus of her three-part E! special Nicki Minaj: My Truth.

Composition

Minaj commented on On Air with Ryan Seacrest that "I feel like the music is such a better representation of me where I am now as an artist in my career. As long as people can hear the music, I'm good." Much of the new material incorporates hip hop and R&B styles previously seen in Minaj's earlier mixtapes. The opening track "Up in Flames" incorporates a "slow, heavy and melodramatic beat", where Minaj addresses her wealth and delivers negative remarks directed towards her adversaries. The second song "Freedom" was compared to material from her debut studio album Pink Friday (2010); it utilizes minimal production and reflects on Minaj's rise to prominence. The third song "Hell Yeah" features Parker and further criticizes Minaj's opponents. She references her much-publicized on-set tension with fellow American Idol judge Mariah Carey in the line "But I'm quick to check a bitch if she’s outta line" and references the series' personnel in the line "Shout out Mike Darnell and Nigel [Lythgoe] / Why these bums so mad that the queen on Idol".

The fourth track "High School" features Lil Wayne and discusses sexual desires with a man who had been in prison. The fifth song "I'm Legit" features Ciara and was characterized by having "snappy flows" and being "primed for the streets and clubs". The sixth track "I Endorse These Strippers" features Tyga and Brinx; its lyrics were described by Sal Cinquemani of Slant as "less clever than inexcusably archaic". The seventh song "The Boys" features American recording artist Cassie. It incorporates both hip hop and electropop influences, and has been described as a "girls' night anthem". The final track "Va Va Voom" was previously included on the original deluxe version of Pink Friday: Roman Reloaded, and also contains prominent electropop styles.

Singles
"The Boys", a collaboration with Cassie, was released as the lead single from The Re-Up on September 13, 2012. The song peaked at number 41 on the US Billboard Hot R&B/Hip-Hop Songs chart. Its music video premiered through Vevo on October 18, 2012.

"Freedom" was released as the second single digitally through iTunes on November 2, 2012. The song peaked at number 31 on the Billboard Hot R&B/Hip-Hop Songs chart. Its music video premiered on 106 and Park on November 19, 2012.

The third single "High School" features Lil Wayne and was released on April 16, 2013. The song peaked at number 64 on the Billboard Hot 100, and at number 20 on the Billboard Hot R&B/Hip-Hop Songs chart. Its music video was released by MTV on April 2, 2013.

In 2021, the track "I'm Legit", featuring Ciara received a resurgence almost 9 years since its original release on TikTok, being used in many videos.

Critical reception

Pink Friday: Roman Reloaded - The Re-Up received generally positive reviews from music critics. At Metacritic, which assigns a normalized rating out of 100 to reviews from mainstream critics, the album received an average score of 72, based on eight reviews, an improvement over the average score of 60 received by the original release of Roman Reloaded. David Jeffries of AllMusic opined that "the too-pop Roman Reloaded now feels more balanced once this eight-track EP worth of material tips the scales", adding that the additional tracks and DVD is "the better deal and bigger picture" than the original. Dan Weiss of the Boston Phoenix complimented Minaj's rapping, commenting that "the rapper who rhymes "fri-vo-lous" with "po-ly-ga-mist" is X-Acto sharp as ever". The Los Angeles Times Gerrick D. Kennedy noted the variety of genres incorporated in the reissue, stating "Sure, she flirts with dance pop and R&B balladry, but you can forgive her for wanting to satisfy different tastes. Here, it actually works". Andy Gill of The Independent provided a mixed review, feeling that the material was generic and "does not add much to the Minaj experience". Slant Magazines Sal Cinquemani criticized the lyrical content and featured guests, adding that "as long as [Minaj] keeps comparing herself to Jesus, we probably shouldn't hold our breath". Kyle Anderson of Entertainment Weekly panned the album and placed it at number two on his list of The Worst Albums Of The Year, writing that the album was "soul-less, lazy, and totally unnecessary."

Commercial performance
Charting together with the original Pink Friday: Roman Reloaded (according to the rules by Billboard), The Re-Up sold 36,000 copies in first-week sales and rose eighty spots on the US Billboard 200, from number 107 to number 27, with a 591% sales gain. An associate from Billboard commented on the commercial performance of The Re-Up stating that "expanded reissues aren't always guaranteed big sellers. It really depends on the extra content and timing of the release ... Nicki's reissue was seemingly timed to profit from holiday shopping", also adding that the sales of The Re-Up were actually better than similar reissues by Minaj's contemporaries. In New Zealand, the album charted within Roman Reloaded release and debuted at twenty-one.

Minaj commented that of the album's limited availability, "it's hard to get the album because the stores basically said that the last few re-releases [stores] had put out did not do well and they didn't want to take a chance. Target and Wal-Mart are not selling the album, and Target is actually my biggest retailer. Best Buy only took limited [stock] because they wanted to play it safe. It kinda sets you up to fail." Walmart responded that they do not issue albums with the Parental Advisory label, while Target sold the record on their website anyway.

Track listing

Notes
 (*) Denotes co-producer.

Personnel
Credits adapted from Allmusic.

Performance

Nicki Minaj – primary artist
2 Chainz – featured artist
Beenie Man – featured artist
Brinx – featured artist
Chris Brown – featured artist
Cam'ron – featured artist
Ciara - featured artist
Cassie – featured artist
Drake – featured artist
Lil Wayne – featured artist
Nas – featured artist
Parker – featured artist
Rick Ross – featured artist
Tyga – featured artist
Bobby V – featured artist
Young Jeezy – featured artist
Marissa Bregman – vocals
Carl Falk – vocals
Kalenna Harper – vocals
Wayne Hector – vocals
Amoy Levy – vocals
Mohombi – vocals
Renee Rowe – vocals
AJ Junior – vocals (background)
Bilal "The Chef" Hajji – vocals (background)
LaKeisha Lewis – vocals (background)
Jeanette Olsson – vocals (background)
RedOne – vocals (background)
Teddy Sky – vocals (background)
Candace Marie Wakefield – vocals (background)

Producers

Cortez Bryant – executive producer
Dwayne Carter – executive producer
Nicki Minaj – executive producer
Jermaine Preyan – executive producer
Safaree "SB" Samuels – executive producer
Bryan "Baby Birdman" Williams – executive producer
Ronald "Slim Tha Don" Williams – executive producer
Carl Falk – guitar producer
Nicholas Cooper – vocal producer

Technical

Chris Athens – mastering
Boi-1da – drums, mixing
Tanisha Broadwater – production coordination
Michael "Banger" Cadahia – engineer
Ariel Chobaz – engineer, mixing
Noel Cadastre – recording assistant
Cirkut – instrumentation, musician programming
Donald "Tixie" Dixon – engineer
Aubry "Big Juice" Delaine – mixing
Dr. Luke – instrumentation, musician programming
Zale Epstein – drum programming
Carl Falk – guitar, instrumentation, mixing
Elizabeth Gallardo – recording assistant
Brian "Big Bass" Gardner – mastering
Serban Ghenea – mixing
Clint Gibbs – recording assistant
John Hanes – mixing engineer
Jess Jackson – engineer
Jimmy Joker – instrumentation
Koool Kojak – musician
Stephen Kozmeniuk – bells, engineer, guitar, organ, synthesizer, viola
Gelly Kusuma – engineer
Maven Boys – additional production
Donnie Meadows – production coordination
Katie Mitzell – production coordination
Trevor Muzzy – engineer, mixing, vocal editing
Chris "Tek" O'Ryan – engineer
Alex P. – engineer, instrumentation, vocal editing
Parker Ighile – engineer mixing, 
RedOne – instrumentation, vocal editing
Irene Richter – production coordination
John Rivers – engineer
Tim Roberts – mixing assistant
Bret Ryan – clapping, piano
Phil Seaford – mixing assistant
Noah Shebib – engineer
Jon Sher – mixing assistant, recording assistant
Finis "KY" White – engineer
Stuart White – engineer
Rami Yacoub – instrumentation, mixing, vocal editing
Scott "Yarmov" Yarmovsky – production coordination

Charts

Weekly charts

Year-end charts

Notes
 A In these territories, The Re-Up was combined with the original chart entry for Pink Friday: Roman Reloaded, and thus re-entered the chart as one release.

Release history

References

2012 compilation albums
Albums produced by Alex da Kid
Albums produced by Boi-1da
Albums produced by Cirkut
Albums produced by Dr. Luke
Albums produced by Dreamlab
Albums produced by Hit-Boy
Albums produced by J. R. Rotem
Albums produced by Juicy J
Albums produced by Kane Beatz
Albums produced by RedOne
Albums produced by T-Minus (record producer)
Cash Money Records albums
Nicki Minaj albums
Reissue albums
Young Money Entertainment albums